Robert Sanderson McCormick (July 26, 1849 – April 16, 1919) was an American diplomat. Born in rural Virginia, he was part of the extended McCormick family that became influential in Chicago.

Early life
McCormick was born July 26, 1849 on the family plantation known as Walnut Grove in Rockbridge County, Virginia.  His father was William Sanderson McCormick (1815–1865) and his mother was Mary Ann (née Grigsby) McCormick (1828–1878), whose family owned the Hickory Hill plantation.

When Robert was an infant, his family moved to Chicago to join the McCormick family agricultural machinery business, which became known as International Harvester. He attended prep school at the University of Chicago and went to college at the University of Virginia.

Career
McCormick formed a partnership with his paternal cousin Hugh Leander Adams, which they named McCormick & Adams, to invest in a grain elevator at St. Louis, Missouri in 1876.  In the continuing national economic troubles in the aftermath of the panic of 1873, the enterprise failed.

Diplomatic career
Politically active and a major donor to the Republican Party, in 1889 McCormick was appointed as Second Secretary of the American Legation in London, where he served from 1889 to 1892, under Minister Robert Todd Lincoln. That led to his appointment as official representative for the Chicago 1893 Exhibition.

His diplomatic career took off when President William McKinley appointed him as U.S. Minister to Austria-Hungary on March 7, 1901.  McCormick presented his credentials on April 29, 1901 and served through McKinley's assassination at the Pan-American Exposition on September 14, 1901.  McCormick continued in the role during Theodore Roosevelt's term and when the relationship between the two countries was upgraded, he was promoted becoming the first American ambassador to Austria-Hungary on May 27, 1902 and served in that role until December 29, 1902.

On September 26, 1902, Roosevelt appointed him to St. Petersburg to serve as United States Ambassador to Imperial Russia. He was commissioned during a recess of the Senate and recommissioned on December 8, 1902 after confirmation.  McCormick presented his credentials on January 12, 1903 and was present in St Petersburg during the Bloody Sunday protests of that year.   After reaching appointment as U.S. Ambassador to France on March 8, 1905, he presented his recall on March 27, 1905.

He presented his credentials in Paris on May 2, 1905 and replaced Horace Porter.  McCormick served for almost two years, retiring from the diplomatic services in 1907 when his health started to decline.  He presented his recall on March 2, 1907 and was replaced by Henry White, who had been the Ambassador to Italy.

Personal life

On June 8, 1876, he married Katherine van Etta "Kate" Medill (1853–1932). She was a daughter of Joseph Medill (1823–1899), who owned and managed the Chicago Tribune newspaper.  Together, they were the parents of three children:

 Joseph Medill McCormick (1877–1925), who became a U.S. Senator from Illinois.  He married Ruth Hanna, daughter of the Ohio Senator Mark Hanna.
 Katrina McCormick (1879–1879), who died in infancy.
 Robert Rutherford McCormick (1880–1955), who became the influential editor of the Chicago Tribune.

McCormick died from pneumonia on April 16, 1919 at his home in Hinsdale, Illinois. He was buried in Graceland Cemetery.

Awards 
In 1907, Emperor Nicholas II of Russia conferred on him the Order of St. Alexander Nevsky, in recognition of his services to Russia during the war with Japan.
The Japanese decorated him with the first class of the Order of the Rising Sun, for his attention to Japan's interest during the Russo-Japanese War. He was credited with negotiating with Russia to allow Jews to emigrate using US passports, as suggested by Chicago Rabbi Emil G. Hirsch.
The French government conferred on him the Grand Cordon of the Legion of Honor, for furthering the relations between France and the United States.

Family tree

References 

 

1849 births
1919 deaths
Burials at Graceland Cemetery (Chicago)
McCormick family
Recipients of the Order of the Rising Sun
Politicians from Chicago
People from Rockbridge County, Virginia
Ambassadors of the United States to Austria
Ambassadors of the United States to France
Ambassadors of the United States to Russia
Grand Croix of the Légion d'honneur
Illinois Republicans
University of Chicago alumni
University of Virginia alumni
Deaths from pneumonia in Illinois